Arne Joakim Andersson (born 9 September 1971) is a retired diver from Sweden. He won four medals (three silver, one bronze) at the European Championships in the early 1990s.

Andersson represented Sweden in three consecutive Summer Olympics, starting in 1988 (Seoul, South Korea). He was affiliated with the Jönköpings Simsällskap during his career.

References 

1971 births
Living people
Swedish male divers
Divers at the 1988 Summer Olympics
Divers at the 1992 Summer Olympics
Divers at the 1996 Summer Olympics
Olympic divers of Sweden
Sportspeople from Jönköping
20th-century Swedish people
21st-century Swedish people